Forrest Seabury (1876 - 1944) was an actor in theater and silent films.

He was named Sumner Forrest Seabury by his parents. His father, also named Forrest Seabury, was a scenic artist who died in 1895. They descended from the Bishop of Connecticut.

In 1914 he was in the theatrical production The Governor's Boss.

He was the father of Ynez Seabury, who also became an actress.

Filmography
Wild and Woolly (1917) as Banker
The White Man's Law (1918) as Cpl. Verne
The Honor of His House (1918) as Mr. Proudweather
Such a Little Pirate (1918) as Ellory Glendenning
The Secret Garden as Indian Servant
The Drums of Jeopardy (1923) as Stefani
The Auction Block (1926) as Edward Blake
Ranson's Folly (1926 film) as Drummer

References

1876 births
1944 deaths
American male silent film actors
American male stage actors